Madrasa Al Husseiniya Al Kubra also known as the Tourbet El Bey Madrasa, is one of the madrasahs of the medina of Tunis.

Location 

The madrasa is located in Tourbet El Bey Street, next to Tourbet El Bey Mausoleum itself.

History
It was built during the reign of Ali II ibn Hussein in 1777. It is considered one of the medina's biggest madrasas with more than 40 rooms.

Architecture
The madrasa has two floors and a large hall. The 43 rooms are used to host students of Al-Zaytuna University.
Also, it has a prayer room that was used for praying and teaching.

References 

Madrasas in the medina of Tunis